Ramal do Montijo, originally called Ramal de Aldegallega or Ramal de Aldeia Galega, the former name of Montijo, is a closed railway line which connected Pinhal Novo to Montijo, in Portugal. It was opened on 4 October 1908 and closed in 1989.

See also 
 List of railway lines in Portugal
 List of Portuguese locomotives and railcars
 History of rail transport in Portugal

References

Sources

Iberian gauge railways
Mon
Railway lines opened in 1908
Railway lines closed in 1989